Frankie Lane (20 July 1948 – 19 May 2011) was an English footballer who played as a goalkeeper. He began his Football League career with Tranmere Rovers, before joining Liverpool, where he spent four years as reserve goalkeeper. He made only two appearances for the club – the first of which, against Derby County, was notable for an incident where he safely caught a cross, only to step back over his goal line – but did make it onto the bench for the 1973 UEFA Cup Final, before leaving to join Notts County in 1975. He was also second choice at Meadow Lane, understudying Eric McManus, before dropping into non-league football with Kettering Town in March 1978.
Lane died in May 2011.

References

External links
Profile at LFCHistory.net
Tranmere Rovers Page on passing of Frank Lane

1948 births
2011 deaths
People from Wallasey
English footballers
Association football goalkeepers
Tranmere Rovers F.C. players
Liverpool F.C. players
Notts County F.C. players
Kettering Town F.C. players
Bedford Town F.C. players
UEFA Cup winning players